Dubeninki  is a village in Gołdap County, Warmian-Masurian Voivodeship, in northern Poland, close to the border with the Kaliningrad Oblast of Russia. It is the seat of the gmina (administrative district) called Gmina Dubeninki.

The village has a population of 962.

References

Dubeninki